Agdistis clara is a moth in the family Pterophoridae. It is known from Namibia, Botswana and South Africa.

References

Agdistinae
Moths of Africa
Plume moths of Africa
Moths described in 1986